Peter John Morland Openshaw,  (born 11 November 1954) is a British clinician and scientist specialising in lung immunology, particularly defence against viral infections. He trained in lung diseases and undertook a PhD in immunology before establishing a laboratory at St Mary's Hospital Medical School (later part of Imperial College London). He created the academic department of Respiratory Medicine and the Centre for Respiratory Infection at Imperial College and was elected President of the British Society for Immunology in 2014.

Early life
Openshaw was born in 1954 in Glastonbury, Somerset. He attended Millfield Junior School, then the Quaker boarding schools Sidcot School and Bootham School, followed by Guy's Hospital Medical School (University of London). He earned an intercalated BSc in Physiology (Hons., 1976), qualified in medicine (MB BS, 1979), and worked at the Royal Brompton Hospital and as medical registrar at Royal Postgraduate Medical School (Hammersmith Hospital).

Career
Immunological work
Originally trained in lung mechanics, his PhD at the National Institute for Medical Research at Mill Hill, London was in T cell immunology. He has worked on protective and harmful immunological reactions to viruses, inflammatory lung disease and vaccine development since 1985, writing over 200 scientific articles (h-index= 78).

Respiratory virus research
He was awarded the Chanock prize (2012, Santa Fe USA) in recognition of his lifetime achievement in work on respiratory syncytial virus (RSV) research.  He has been involved in influenza policy since 2002 as a member of UK advisory boards and was Vice President of ESWI (European Scientific Working Group on Influenza) from 2009-2014. In 2009 he set up the MOSAIC consortium, a collaboration of 45 co-investigators studying the host response to influenza in patients admitted to 11 hospitals in London and Liverpool (Wellcome Trust/MRC support) and directs studies of viral challenge of human volunteers.

Academic leadership
Openshaw established the academic department of Respiratory Medicine on the St Mary’s Campus of Imperial College and created the Centre for Respiratory Infection (Wellcome Trust funded).  He became President of the British Society for Immunology in 2014, the first clinician to lead the Society. He has sat on numerous governmental, grant awarding and international committees.

Advisory
Openshaw is a member of the New and Emerging Respiratory Virus Threats Advisory Group (NERVTAG) in the UK.

Honours 
Fellow of the Royal College of Physicians (1994), Fellow of the Academy of Medical Sciences (1999); Fellow of the Society of Biology (2014); National Institute for Health Research (NIHR) Senior Investigator (2013).

Openshaw was appointed Commander of the Order of the British Empire (CBE) in the 2022 New Year Honours for services to medicine and immunology.

Selected publications

References

1954 births
Living people
People educated at Millfield
People educated at Sidcot School
People educated at Bootham School
British immunologists
Alumni of King's College London
Fellows of the Royal College of Physicians
Fellows of the Academy of Medical Sciences (United Kingdom)
NIHR Senior Investigators
Commanders of the Order of the British Empire
People from Glastonbury
20th-century English medical doctors
21st-century English medical doctors